Komi State Pedagogical Institute is a higher education institution founded on 18 November 1931 to train teachers. Reorganized on 14 February 2013 as a merger with Syktyvkar State University.

History 

On 18 November 1931, by the Decree of the Council of People's Commissars of the RSFSR, the Komi State Pedagogical Institute was established in the city of Syktyvkar. A. F. Bogdanov was appointed the first rector of the institute. Among the first teachers were professors Vasily Lytkin and A. S. Sidorov, a total of seventeen teachers, including one professor, eight associate professors, five assistants and three teachers. At the end of 1931, the first set of applicants was recruited, a total of one hundred and twenty-two people were accepted, of which: one hundred people for the first year, and twenty-two people for the second from those transferred to the institute from other higher educational institutions. The opening of the educational process took place on 21 February 1932, the curricula of the institute at that time were drawn up for three years. The structure of the institute consisted of three departments: chemical and biological, physical and mathematical (technical) and social and literary, as well as nine general institute departments included in these departments.

From 1934 to 1954, the Teachers' Institute (two-year) functioned at the Komi State Pedagogical Institute to train teachers of an incomplete secondary school. Since 1935, the structure of the institute has changed, on the basis of three departments, four faculties were created: physics and mathematics, natural sciences, philology (language and literature) and history. In 1936, in addition to full-time, a correspondence department was also opened. In 1938, the first academic building was built for the institute, and in 1965, the second. From 1936 to 1941, about eight hundred teachers graduated from the walls of the institute to educational institutions of the Komi ASSR. In 1981, by the Decree of the Presidium of the Supreme Soviet of the USSR "for achievements in training" the Komi State Pedagogical Institute was awarded the Order of the Badge of Honor.

For the period from 1990 to 2014, the Institute had full-time and part-time departments, eight faculties: Geography and Biology, Philology, Foreign Languages, Physics and Mathematics, Pedagogy and Methods of Primary Education, Technology and Entrepreneurship, Additional Teaching Professions, Additional Professional Education, seven general institute departments: pedagogy, sociology and political science, philosophy, history and economic theory, general psychology, physical education and foreign languages. More than three thousand nine hundred students were trained at the correspondence and full-time departments. In 1991, the Komi republican lyceum-boarding school of part-time education for gifted children from rural areas was established at the institute, in the amount of more than five hundred students. From 1932 to 2014, the institute trained about thirty thousand highly qualified specialist teachers, of which more than one thousand two hundred were subsequently awarded the honorary title of Honored Teachers of the Republican and All-Union (All-Russian) level.

On 14 February 2013, by order of the Ministry of Education and Science of the Russian Federation, as a result of the reorganization of the Komi State Pedagogical Institute, it was merged with Syktyvkar State University.

Awards 
 Order of the Badge of Honour (UPVS USSR in 1981 - "for achievements in training personnel")

Management 
 Alexander Filimonovich Bogdanov (1931-1932)
 Vasily Alexandrovich Aibabin (1932-1933)
 Dmitry Ivanovich Shulepov (1933-1935)
 Nikolai Afanasyevich Mikheev (1935-1937, 1945–1948)
 Pitirim Ivanovich Razmyslov (1937-1938)
 Dan Timofeevich Stepulo (1938-1941)
 Gennady Petrovich Balin (1938, 1941)
 Konstantin Dmitrievich Mitropolsky (1941-1943)
 Andrey Grigoryevich Nazarkin (1943-1945)
 Alexander Alexandrovich Kokarev (1948-1953)
 Nikolai Vasilievich Shuktomov (1953-1956)
 Petr Efimovich Kuklev (1956-1958)
 Nikolai Prokopyevich Beznosikov (1961-1972)
 Vasily Nikolaevich Akhmeev (1972-2003)
 Valeryan Nikolaevich Isakov (2003-2011)
 Mikhail Dmitrievich Kitaigorodsky (2011-2014)

Notable faculty and alumni 

 Vasily Lytkin - Doctor of Philology, Academician of the Finnish Academy of Sciences. Laureate of the State Prize of the Komi ASSR. Kuratova, Honored Worker of Science and Technology of the RSFSR and Komi ASSR.
 Frolov, Nikolai Adrianovich - Professor
 Stepanov, Pavel Dmitrievich - archaeologist, ethnographer, historian, doctor of historical sciences, professor
 Galperin, Vladimir Abramovich - literary critic and professor of literature
 Sidorov, Alexey Semyonovich - Doctor of Philology, linguist and ethnographer, specialist in the language and culture of the Komi, one of the founders of the Komi scientific ethnographic school
 Yukhnin, Vasily Vasilyevich - Soviet Komi novelist
 Elkina, Anna Mikhailovna - Chairman of the Presidium of the Supreme Soviet of the Komi ASSR
 Baluev, Veniamin Georgievich - Lieutenant General, Chairman of the KGB of the Byelorussian SSR
 Marina Pylayeva - Honored Master of Sports of Russia, silver medalist of the World Championship and bronze medalist of the European Championship
 Vladimir Torlopov - Chairman of the State Council of the Komi Republic, head of the Komi Republic, member of the Federation Council
 Igushev, Evgeny Alexandrovich - Doctor of Philology, Professor
 Zaboeva, Iya Vasilievna - Doctor of Agricultural Sciences, Director and Chief Researcher of the Institute of Biology, Komi Scientific Center, Ural Branch of the Russian Academy of Sciences
 Olga Savastianova - Deputy of the State Duma of the VII convocation, Chairman of the State Duma Committee on Control and Regulations, Commissioner for Human Rights in Komi
 Estafiev, Aleksey Aleksandrovich - Doctor of Biology, Leading Researcher, Institute of Biology, Komi Scientific Center, Ural Branch of the Russian Academy of Sciences
 Suvorov, Alexander Vasilievich - poet
 Timin, Vladimir Vasilyevich - People's Poet of the Komi Republic, Honored Worker of Culture of the Russian Federation

References

Literature 
 Республика Коми. Энциклопедия : В 3 т. / Коми науч. центр УрО РАН; Рощевский М. П. (гл. ред.) и др. - Сыктывкар : Коми кн. изд-во, Т. 2. — 1999. — 575 с. — 
 Коми государственному педагогическому институту — 70 лет / М-во образования Рос. Федерации; В.Н. Ахмеев и др. - Сыктывкар : КГПИ, 2002. — 126 с.
 Летопись Коми государственного педагогического института (1932—2014) / сост.: В. Н. Исаков и др., Министерство науки и высшего образования Российской Федерации, ФГБОУ ВО "СГУ им. Питирима Сорокина"; Сыктывкар, 2019.

Links 

 

Universities in Russia
Teachers colleges in Russia 
Public universities and colleges in Russia
Buildings and structures in the Komi Republic
Syktyvkar
Educational institutions established in 1931
1931 establishments in Russia
Defunct universities and colleges in Russia 
2013 disestablishments in Russia
Educational institutions disestablished in 2013